Mário Narciso  (born 4 December 1953) is a Portuguese former footballer and currently the head coach for the Portugal national beach soccer team.

Career 
Narciso began his career at the youth level with Vitória Setúbal in 1968. In 1972, he played in the Primeira Divisão with Vitória Setúbal's senior team. The following season he played in the Segunda Divisão with S.C.U. Torreense, and later returned to Vitória Setúbal where he played for five seasons. In the summer of 1976 he played in the National Soccer League with Toronto Italia. Midway through the 1976 season he played with league rivals Toronto First Portuguese.

In 1980, he played with Amora F.C., and Vitória Guimarães for one season each. In 1982, he returned to former club Vitória Setúbal for a season, and later played with Sport Benfica e Castelo Branco. He would conclude his career in the Segunda Divisão, and Terceira Divisão with G.D. Torralta.

Managerial career 
In 2013, he was named the head coach for the Portugal national beach soccer team, and secured two FIFA Beach Soccer World Cups in 2015, and 2019.
Along with the rest of the Portuguese technical team, he was made a Grand Officer of the Order of Merit in recognition of his achievements following the 2019 success.

References  

1953 births
Association football midfielders
Portuguese football managers
Portuguese footballers
Vitória F.C. players
S.C.U. Torreense players
Toronto Italia players
Toronto First Portuguese players
Amora F.C. players
Vitória S.C. players
Sport Benfica e Castelo Branco players
Primeira Liga players
Segunda Divisão players
Canadian National Soccer League players
Sportspeople from Setúbal
Grand Officers of the Order of Merit (Portugal)
Portuguese expatriate footballers
Expatriate soccer players in Canada
Portuguese expatriate sportspeople in Canada
Living people